Berghem is a hamlet in the Netherlands, in the province of Limburg. It is located about 1 km south of the town of Gulpen, in the municipality of Gulpen-Wittem.

Berghem is not a statistical entity, and the postal authorities have placed it under Gulpen. There are no place name signs. It was home to 47 people in 1840. Nowadays, it consists of about 5 houses.

References

Populated places in Limburg (Netherlands)
Gulpen-Wittem